Wang Wenyin (born 1968) is a Chinese businessman and chairman of Amer International Group, a Chinese company that produces cable and copper products.

Early life
Wang was born in the Chinese province of Anhui in 1968. He graduated from Nanjing University in 1993, then worked in a warehouse as a manager before starting his own powercord business which eventually grew into Amer International Group.

Career
He has multiplied Amer International Group’s mines and factories and has influenced his company in the Communist Party in attempt to challenge the dominance of China’s state-owned giant corporations. It was reported in March 2014 that Wang Wenyin planned to set up a company in Singapore to expand the trading of metals and to purchase global mining assets. As of 25 June 2015, Wang Wenyin was ranked number 125 on Forbes’ list of global billionaires with a net worth of $15 billion, and the 8th richest man in China.

Personal life
As of 2015, Wang resides in Shenzhen, China.

References 

1968 births
Living people
Businesspeople from Anhui
Chinese billionaires
People from Qianshan, Anhui
Nanjing University alumni
Chinese company founders
Chinese mining businesspeople